Frederick Cornell may refer to:

 Frederick Carruthers Cornell (1867–1921), South African short story writer
 Frederick F. Cornell (1804–1875), pastor of Pluckemin Presbyterian Church